The Logan Collegians were a minor league baseball team based in Logan, Utah. Between 1902 and 1927, Logan teams played as members of the 1902 Utah State League, 1921 Class D level Northern Utah League and Class C level Utah-Idaho League in 1926 and 1927.

History
Minor League baseball began in Logan in 1902, when the Logan team played as members of the four–team Independent level Utah State League. Logan played the season under manager Harry Stovey. The 1902 Utah State League final standings are unknown. The Utah State League disbanded following the 1902 season.

In 1921, the Logan "Collegians" became charter members of the Class D level Northern Utah League. The Northern Utah League began play as a six–team league and Logan played with hosting franchises from Brigham City, Utah (Brigham City Peaches), Lewiston, Idaho (Lewiston Broncs), Ogden, Utah (Ogden), Smithfield, Utah (Smithfield Blue Sox) and Tremonton, Utah (Tremonton Bears).

The Logan Collegians finished the 1921 season with a record of 8–9, placing 4th in the six–team Northern Utah League. Playing under manager Lewis Edwards, The Collegians Logan finished 5.5 games behind the 1st place Tremonton team. The Northern Utah League folded as a minor league after the 1921 season.

The Logan use of the "Collegians" moniker corresponds to Logan, Utah being home to Utah State University, founded in 1888.

In 1926, the Logan Collegians became charter members of the Class C level Utah-Idaho League. The Collegians joined the Idaho Falls Spuds, Ogden Gunners, Pocatello Bannocks, Salt Lake City Bees and Twin Falls Bruins, playing in the new six–team league.

The 1926 Collegians placed 4th in the first year of the Utah–Idaho League. Logan ended the 1926 season with a record of 48–65, finishing 26.5 games behind the 1st place Idaho Falls Spuds, playing under managers Harry Wolter, Nick Williams and Nate Shandling. The Logan Collegians began play at Crimson Field.

In their final season of minor league play, the Logan Collegians ended the 1927 Utah–Idaho League season in 4th place. With a 49–51 record, the Collegians finished 7.5 games behind the champion Ogden Gunners. Harry Wolter served as player/manager in 1927. The Logan franchise folded after the 1927 season and was replaced in the 1928 Utah–Idaho League season by the Boise Senators.

Logan, Utah has not hosted another minor league team.

The ballpark
The Logan Collegians were noted to have played minor league home games at Crimson Field beginning in 1926. Crimson Field had a capacity of 2,500. Today, Crimson Field is still in use as home to Logan High School sports teams. The address is 162 West 100 South, Logan, Utah.

Timeline

Year–by–year records

Notable alumni

Dolph Camilli (1926–1927)
Ed Coleman (1926)
Roy Hartzell (1902)
Eddie Quick (1902)
Lou Rosenberg (1927)
Harry Stovey (1902, MGR)
Harry Wolter  (1926–1927, MGR)

See also
Logan Collegians players

References

External links
Logan - Baseball Reference

Defunct minor league baseball teams
Sports teams in Utah
Baseball teams established in 1921
Baseball teams disestablished in 1927
1921 establishments in Utah
Defunct baseball teams in Utah
Professional baseball teams in Utah
Logan, Utah
Cache County, Utah
1927 disestablishments in Utah
Northern Utah League teams